Andy Murray defeated Roberto Bautista Agut in the final, 7−6(7−1), 6−1 to win the singles tennis title at the 2016 Shanghai Masters. It was his third Shanghai Masters and 13th Masters 1000 title overall.

Novak Djokovic was the defending champion, but lost in the semifinals to Bautista Agut.

Seeds
The top eight seeds receive a bye into the second round.

Draw

Finals

Top half

Section 1

Section 2

Bottom half

Section 3

Section 4

Qualifying

Seeds

Qualifiers

Qualifying draw

First qualifier

Second qualifier

Third qualifier

Fourth qualifier

Fifth qualifier

Sixth qualifier

Seventh qualifier

References
 Main Draw
 Qualifying Draw

Singles